Varesabad (also Romanized as Vāres̄ābād; also known as Varavasht) is a village in Khanandabil-e Gharbi Rural District, in the Central District of Khalkhal County, Ardabil Province, Iran. At the 2006 census, its population was 49, in 10 families.

References 

Tageo

Towns and villages in Khalkhal County
Settled areas of Elburz